Arlene Buszka (May 13, 1934 – July 16, 2016) was a utility infielder who played in the All-American Girls Professional Baseball League.

Buszka appears in the records as a member of the South Bend Blue Sox club during its 1953 season.

Nevertheless, the league stopped individual achievements after 1948, so individual accomplishments are complete only through 1949.

Buszka is part of the AAGPBL permanent display at the Baseball Hall of Fame and Museum in Cooperstown, New York opened in 1988, which is dedicated to the entire league rather than any individual figure.

Sources

1934 births
2016 deaths
All-American Girls Professional Baseball League players
Baseball players from Detroit
People from Rochester Hills, Michigan
South Bend Blue Sox players
21st-century American women